La Grande Course is an international competition of ski mountaineering in stages. It includes the most important competitions of the season for teams of two or three competitors.

As of 2015 the senior events of La Grande Course represented a total length of 355 km and 38 km in altitude, but not all events are run every year. There are also six races on specific trails aimed at the cadet (15-16-17 years) and junior categories (18-19-20 years) that compete in teams of two.

Starting in the 2014/15 ski mountaineering season the La Grande Course events are integrated into the International Ski Mountaineering Federation (ISMF) competition calendar, as the Long Distance Team events for the ISMF World Cup.

Events

Every year
 Pierra Menta, France, four-day race, teams of two
 Altitoy Ternua, France, two-day race, teams of two

Even-numbered years (e.g. 2016 and 2018)
 Tour du Rutor, Italy, three-day race, teams of two
 Patrouille des Glaciers, Switzerland, four-day race, teams of three

Odd-numbered years (e.g. 2017 and 2019) 
 Adamello Ski Raid, Italy, teams by two
 Mezzalama Trophy, Italy, teams of three

References

External links 
 
 
 Adamello
 Altitoy Ternua
 Tour du Rutor
 Patrouille des Glaciers
 Pierra Menta (in French)
 Troféo Mezzalama
Ski mountaineering competitions
Skiing competitions in Europe